Pia Z. Ehrhardt is an American writer whose story collection Famous Fathers was published by MacAdam/Cage in 2007. Ehrhardt has also been published in Narrative Magazine, McSweeney's and The Mississippi Review. She acted as Guest Editor for Guernica Magazine in September, 2009. She is the winner of the 2005 Narrative Prize.

References

External links
 Author's Website
 Guest editor letter in Guernica Magazine, September, 2009
 Carnivale, short story in SmokeLong Quarterly, June 15, 2004
 Summer Swim, short story in SmokeLong Quarterly, August 15, 2004
 interview in SmokeLong Quarterly, June 15, 2004
 interview in SmokeLong Quarterly, August 15, 2004

Year of birth missing (living people)
Living people
American writers
American women writers
21st-century American women